This is a list of State Presidents of the Orange Free State.

List

Last election

See also
State President of the South African Republic

External links

Archontology.org: Orange Free State: Heads of State: 1854–1902

Orange Free State